Snow Hill railway station may refer to:

 Birmingham Snow Hill railway station
 Holborn Viaduct railway station, a former railway station in London, part of which was previously known as Snow Hill
 St Helier (Snow Hill) railway station, a former railway station on Jersey in the Channel Islands